Events from the year 1754 in Austria

Incumbents
 Monarch – Maria Theresa

Events

 - Bega canal
 - Gorizia and Gradisca
 - Madonna del Terremoto (Mantua)

Births

Deaths

References

 
Years of the 18th century in Austria